Trusts & Trustees is a peer-reviewed law journal published ten times per year by Oxford University Press. The journal covers trust law and practice, including case notes on topical cases and updates on trends and developments from around the world. The editors-in-chief are Toby Graham (Farrer & Co., United Kingdom) and David Russell QC (barrister, Outer Temple Chambers Dubai and London, and Chairman of the STEP International Client Special Interest Group).

External links 
 

Business law journals
Oxford University Press academic journals
Publications established in 1994
English-language journals
Wills and trusts
Equity (law)